The Charles N. Fowler House is a historic house at 518 Salem Avenue in Elizabeth, New Jersey.  Built in 1909, it is a prominent local example of Georgian Revival architecture, featuring a semi-circular projecting Doric portico topped by a metal dome (a later addition).  It was designed by the New York firm Carrere & Hastings for Charles N. Fowler, a prominent local banker and United States Congressman.  In 1930 Fowler sold the building to the Vail-Deane School.  It is now home to a Dar-ul-Islam, an Islamic mosque and community center.

The building was listed on the National Register of Historic Places in 1986.

See also
National Register of Historic Places listings in Union County, New Jersey

References

Houses on the National Register of Historic Places in New Jersey
National Register of Historic Places in Union County, New Jersey
Colonial Revival architecture in New Jersey
Houses completed in 1909
Houses in Union County, New Jersey
Buildings and structures in Elizabeth, New Jersey